Saint James North Western is a parliamentary constituency represented in the House of Representatives of the Jamaican Parliament. It elects one Member of Parliament (MP) by the first past the post system of election.  It was one of the 32 constituencies fixed in the new constitution granted to Jamaica in 1944. The constituency has featured in all 16 contested Parliamentary General Elections from 1944 to 2016. The current MP is the Hon. Dr. Horace Chang, representing the Jamaica Labour Party, who has been in office since 2002.

Boundaries 

The constituency covers four electoral divisions – sections of Montego Bay North, Montego Bay North East, Montego Bay West and all of Montego Bay Central. This encompasses the Flankers, Glendevon, Norwood, and Albion areas of  Montego Bay.

Members of Parliament

1944 to Present

Elections

Elections from 2000 to Present

Elections from 1980 to 1999

Elections from 1960 to 1979

Elections from 1944 to 1959

See also
 Politics of Jamaica
 Elections in Jamaica

References

Parliamentary constituencies of Jamaica